Yes! is the fifth studio album by American singer-songwriter Jason Mraz. The album was released on July 11, 2014, Atlantic Records. The album's lead single "Love Someone" was released on May 19, 2014.

The album is a collaboration between Jason Mraz and the members of indie-rock-folk band Raining Jane: Mai Bloomfield, Becky Gebhardt, Chaska Potter and Mona Tavakoli, with whom Mraz has been working since 2007, and who are his backing band on the record, as well as co-writers of majority of the songs.

Critical reception

Yes! was met with generally positive reviews from music critics. At Metacritic, which assigns a normalized rating out of 100 to reviews from critics, the album received an average score of 62, which indicates "generally favorable reviews", based on 6 reviews.

Matt Fruchtman of Slant Magazine gave the album two out of five stars, saying "his wide-lens worldview leaves Yes! feeling like the musical equivalent of a G-rated sitcom." Stephen Thomas Erlewine of AllMusic gave the album four out of five stars, saying "The exclamation point that punctuates its title suggests Jason Mraz may be a little enthusiastic on Yes! but that's a feint, hiding how this 2014 record is the next logical step on the singer/songwriter's road of seduction. Gone is the celebrated wordplay, a self-conscious maturation that was perhaps inevitable, but also absent are the smooth soul flourishes of 2012's Love Is a Four Letter Word."

Commercial performance
The album debuted at number two on the Billboard 200 chart, with first-week sales of 102,000 copies in the United States.

In Canada, the album debuted at number two on the Canadian Albums Chart with 12,000 copies, falling behind Rise Against's The Black Market.

Track listing

Notes
 signifies a co-producer

Personnel
Credits adapted from AllMusic.

Jason Mraz – vocals, acoustic guitar, electric guitar, Fender Rhodes, piano, synthesizer bass, engineering, mixing, production

Raining Jane
Mai Bloomfield – cello, glockenspiel, hi-string guitar, marimba, papoose, vocals
Becky Gebhardt – bass, upright bass, sitar
Chaska Potter – electric guitar, mandolin, ukulele, vocals
Mona Tavakoli – drums, percussion, vocals

Additional musicians
Mike Mogis – banjo, dobro, e-bow, electric guitar, mellotron, pedal steel, synthesizer bass
Andy Powers – banjo, dobro, acoustic guitar, electric guitar, mandolin, pedal steel
Ben Brodin – drums, percussion, piano, organ
Chris Joyner – drones, organ, piano, tanpura
Nate Walcott – organ, piano, Wurlitzer
Brian Jones – drums
John O'Reilly – drums
Stewart Myers – bass
Maryann Galewood – handclapping
Amber Elliot – handclapping
Ms. Tina – handclapping
Colin Killalea – inspiration [sic], vocal arrangement
Regan Sprenkle – vocal arrangement

Technical personnel
Mike Mogis – engineering, mixing, production
Chris Keup – engineering, production, additional production
Stewart Myers – engineering, production, additional production
Justin Hergett – engineering, mixing assistant
David Kalish – engineering
Ben Brodin – assistant engineering
Tony Maserati – mixing
James Krausse – mixing assistant
Chris Gehringer – mastering

Additional personnel
Tony Corey – production management
Jeff Nicholas – creative direction
Sam Riback – A&R
Douglas Gledhill – design
Ryan McCann – design
Patrick Morales – design
Jen Rosenstein – band photo

Charts and certifications

Weekly charts

Year-end charts

Certifications

Release history

References

2014 albums
Jason Mraz albums
Atlantic Records albums